Desmalopex (Known as the White-winged Flying Fox or mottled-winged Flying Fox)
is a genus of megabats in the family Pteropodidae. It has historically been included in the genus Pteropus and occurs only in the Philippines.

It comprises the following species:
White-winged flying fox, Desmalopex leucopterus
Small white-winged flying fox, Desmalopex microleucopterus

References
Esselstyn, J.A., Garcia, H.J.D., Saulog, M.G. and Heaney, L.R. 2008. A new species of Desmalopex (Pteropodidae) from the Philippines, with a phylogenetic analysis of the Pteropodini. Journal of Mammalogy 89(4):815–825.
Giannini, N.P., Almeida, F.C., Simmons, N.B. and Helgen, K.M. 2008. The systematic position of Pteropus leucopterus and its bearing on the monophyly and relationships of Pteropus (Chiroptera: Pteropodidae). Acta Chiropterologica 10(1):11–20.

 
Bat genera
Taxa named by Coenraad Jacob Temminck